Mark Francis Schmitt (February 14, 1923 – December 14, 2011) was an American prelate of the Roman Catholic Church.  He served as the tenth bishop of the Diocese of Marquette in Michigan from 1978 to 1992.

Biography

Early life 
Mark Schmitt was born in Algoma, Wisconsin, on February 14, 1923.  After attending  St. Mary School in Algoma, Schmitt entered the Salvatorian Minor Seminary in St. Nazianz, Wisconsin. He later attended St. John’s Seminary and University in  Collegeville, Minnesota.

Priesthood 
Schmitt was ordained by Bishop Stanislaus Vincent Bona to the priesthood on May 22, 1948, for the Diocese of Green Bay.  After his ordination, Schmitt served as associate pastor at St. Rose Parish in Clintonville, Wisconsin.  Schmitt in 1954 was appointed director of the Manitowoc Apostolate, the diocese branch of Catholic Charities. He also served as director of the diocesan hospitals. In 1960, Schmitt was appointed pastor of Ss. Peter and Paul Parish of Weyauwega, Wisconsin and St. Bernard Parish in Green Bay, Wisconsin.

Auxiliary Bishop of Green Bay 
On April 30, 1970, Pope Paul VI appointed Schmitt as titular bishop of Ceanannus Mór and auxiliary bishop of the Diocese of Green Bay; he was consecrated by Bishop Aloysius John Wycislo in Green Bay on June 24, 1970.

Bishop of Marquette 
On March 21, 1978, Paul VI appointed Schmitt as bishop of the Diocese of Marquette. He was installed on May 8, 1978.  As bishop, Schmitt founded the  Lay Ministries Leadership School to prepare lay parishioners for leadership roles in parishes. He also create bachelor’s and master’s degree programs in pastoral studies.

On October 6, 1992, Pope John Paul II accepted Schmitt's resignation as bishop of Marquette. Mark Schmitt died on December 14, 2011, at a hospice in De Pere, Wisconsin.

Notes

1923 births
2011 deaths
Roman Catholic bishops of Marquette
People from Green Bay, Wisconsin
People from Algoma, Wisconsin
People from Marquette, Michigan
Christianity in Michigan
Religious leaders from Wisconsin
American Roman Catholic bishops by contiguous area of the United States
Catholics from Wisconsin